"Wanna Take You Home" is a song recorded by American country music group Gloriana, written by band member Tom Gossin with Matt Serletic and Wendell Mobley.  It was released in March 2011 as the first single from the album A Thousand Miles Left Behind.  It is the band's last single to feature member Cheyenne Kimball.

Content
Band member Tom Gossin wrote the song with Matt Serletic and Wendell Mobley. Gossin said that he did not have any lyrics when he began writing with the two, and that the idea came once Gossin recalled seeing fans dance in the audience whenever the band performed "Wild at Heart".

Critical reception
Giving it four stars out of five, Bobby Peacock of Roughstock praised the "punchy groove, with plenty of banjo and steel fills".

Music video
The video was the first major music video for director TK McKamy. It was filmed immediately before Cheyenne Kimball left the group. It shows the group performing the song at a huge evening barn party, surrounded by many fans.

Chart performance

References

2011 singles
2011 songs
Gloriana (band) songs
Songs written by Matt Serletic
Song recordings produced by Matt Serletic
Warner Records singles
Music videos directed by TK McKamy
Songs written by Wendell Mobley